The Poteau River is a 141-mile (227 km) long river located in the U.S. states of Arkansas and Oklahoma. It is the only river in Oklahoma that flows north and is the seventh largest river in the state. It is a tributary of the Arkansas River, which itself is a tributary of the Mississippi River.  During the Indian Territory period prior to Oklahoma's statehood (1838-1906), the stream served as the boundary between Skullyville County and Sugar Loaf County, two of the counties making up the Moshulatubbee District of the Choctaw Nation.

Poteau River also serves as the border between the states of Arkansas and Oklahoma for 1 mile to the South of Fort Smith. This gives 57 acres of land to Arkansas that would have been an exclave of the Choctaw nation in 1905, when it was handed over to Arkansas.

Etymology
Poteau is the French word for "post" and it is believed that the river was named in 1716 by French explorers, led by Bernard de la Harpe, who used a post or stake to mark the mouth of the river. The nearby city of Poteau, Oklahoma takes its name from the river.

History 
In the 1820 Treaty of Doak's Sand, and later refined in the 1830 Treaty of Dancing Rabbit Creek between the United States and the Choctaw Nation, the boundary between Arkansas and the Choctaw ran from the Easternmost point under Choctaw control along the red River to the Western edge of Fort Smith, Arkansas. This boundary created an area of approximately 57 acres that was legally Choctaw, but was bounded by Fort Smith in the East, the Arkansas River in the North, and the Poteau River in the Southeast. This caused an effective exclave of the Choctaw Nation only accessible from Arkansas.

This 57-acre area became a hotspot for outlaws avoiding the jurisdiction of Arkansas, while being out of the functional jurisdiction of the Choctaw Nation. The area became known as "Coke Hill" due to the abundance of cocaine smugglers using the plot. In 1905, without consulting the Choctaw, the US government handed the 57 acres over to the state of Arkansas, making the Poteau River the boundary between Arkansas and the Choctaw for around 1 mile. 

This boundary was the de facto border in Oklahoma's constitution, and remained the border undisputed until 1985. In 1985, in the US Supreme Court Case Oklahoma v. Arkansas, Oklahoma argued the territory was unjustly taken from the Choctaw and should be given to Oklahoma. The Supreme court decided on July 1, 1985 that the boundary favoring Arkansas would stand, making the Poteau River the border for approximately 1 mile between Oklahoma and Arkansas.

Course
The Poteau River originates 2 miles (3.2 km) south of Bee Mountain near Waldron, Arkansas, and converges with the Arkansas River at Belle Point in Fort Smith, Arkansas, where it serves as a border between the two states for a short distance. Tributaries of the Poteau River include the Fourche Maline, Brazil and Sans Bois Creeks. Notable towns located along the river, in order from source to mouth, include Wister, Heavener, Poteau, Panama, Spiro, Fort Coffee (all in Oklahoma) and Fort Smith in Arkansas.

Lake Wister
Lake Wister is a reservoir created by the damming of the Poteau River near river mile 70 by Wister Dam which was built in December 1949. Lake Wister State Park has since been built around the reservoir. The lake and dam both take their name from the nearby town of Wister, Oklahoma.

Oklahoma Runestones
Numerous runestones have been found in Oklahoma and are believed by locals to be the works of Viking explorers who traveled up the Poteau River after navigating the Mississippi and Arkansas Rivers, respectively. The evidence surrounding these claims is sparse and inconsistent, however.

The most credible artifact discovered is the "Heavener Runestone," which can be seen in Heavener Runestone Park located in Heavener, Oklahoma.

References

Bodies of water of Le Flore County, Oklahoma
Rivers of Arkansas
Rivers of Oklahoma
Bodies of water of Scott County, Arkansas
Borders of Arkansas
Tributaries of the Arkansas River
Borders of Oklahoma